Italy competed at the FIS Alpine World Ski Championships 1989 in Vail, United States, from 2 to 12 February 1989.

Medalists

At this third edition of the world championships, Italy won no medal.

Results

Top 15 finished

Men

Women

See also
 Italy at the FIS Alpine World Ski Championships
 Italy national alpine ski team

References

External links
 Italian Winter Sports Federation 

Nations at the FIS Alpine World Ski Championships 1989
Alpine World Ski Championships
Italy at the FIS Alpine World Ski Championships